The 34th Air Division (34th AD) is an inactive United States Air Force organization.  Its last assignment was with Air Defense Command at Custer Air Force Station, Michigan.  It was inactivated on 31 December 1969.

History

Assigned to Air Defense Command (ADC) for most of its existence, "from January 1951 until 1960 the 34th administered, trained, operated and supported assigned units, and placed all available combat capable elements in a maximum state of readiness. Initially, its area of responsibility included Arizona, New Mexico, and parts of Nevada, Utah, Colorado, and Texas." It was inactivated and its mission, personnel and equipment were transferred to the Albuquerque Air Defense Sector on 1 January 1960.

Reactivated on 1 April 1966, to perform Air Defense "including all or part of Michigan, Indiana, Ohio, New York, Pennsylvania, West Virginia, Kentucky, Tennessee, and Virginia" assuming responsibility for the missions of the Detroit and parts of the Syracuse Air Defense Sectors.

Assumed additional designation of 34th NORAD Region after activation of the NORAD Combat Operations Center at the Cheyenne Mountain Complex, Colorado and reporting was transferred to NORAD from ADC at Ent Air Force Base in April 1966. The division participated in numerous live and simulated exercises such as Fainting Echo, Apache Arrow, and Fainting Knife.

Inactivated in December 1969 as ADC phased down its interceptor mission as the chances of a Soviet bomber attack on the United States seemed remote, its mission being consolidated into North American Aerospace Defense Command (NORAD).

Lineage
 Established as the 34 Air Division (Defense) on 1 January 1951
 Activated on 5 January 1951
 Inactivated on 1 February 1952
 Organized on 1 February 1952
 Inactivated on 1 January 1960
 Redesignated 34 Air Division and activated on 20 January 1966
 Organized on 1 April 1966
 Inactivated on 31 December 1969

Assignments
 Western Air Defense Force, 5 January 1951 – 1 February 1952
 Central Air Defense Force, 16 February 1953 – 1 January 1960
 Air Defense Command, 20 January 1966
 First Air Force, 1 April 1966 – 31 December 1969.

Stations
 Kirtland Air Force Base, New Mexico, 5 January 1951 – 1 January 1960
 Custer Air Force Station, Michigan, 1 April 1966 – 31 December 1969

Components

Wing
 1st Fighter Wing (Air Defense)
 Selfridge Air Force Base, Michigan, 1 April 1966 – 1 December 1969

Group
 343d Fighter Group (Air Defense)
 Duluth MAP, Minnesota, 15 September-14 November 1969

Interceptor squadrons

 15th Fighter-Interceptor Squadron: 20 April 1953 – 1 January 1960
 Davis–Monthan Air Force Base, Arizona
 58th Fighter-Interceptor Squadron: 1 August 1959 – 1 January 1960
 Walker Air Force Base, New Mexico
 62d Fighter-Interceptor Squadron: 15 September – 14 November 1969
 K.I. Sawyer Air Force Base, Michigan
 75th Fighter-Interceptor Squadron: 30 September 1968 – 30 November 1969
 Wurtsmith Air Force Base, Michigan

 87th Fighter-Interceptor Squadron: 1 April 1966 – 30 September 1968
 Duluth MAP. Minnesota
 93d Fighter-Interceptor Squadron:
 Attached 10 August 1951 – 1 February 1952; 1–5 February 1952
 Assigned 6 February 1952 – 1 January 1960
 Kirtland Air Force Base, New Mexico
 445th Fighter-Interceptor Squadron: 1 April 1966 – 30 September 1968
 Wurtsmith Air Force Base, Michigan

Missile squadron
 35th Air Defense Missile Squadron (BOMARC)
 Niagara Falls Air Force Missile Site, 15 September-19 November 1969

Radar squadrons

 612th Aircraft Control and Warning Squadron
 Ajo Air Force Station, Arizona, 1 January 1958 – 1 January 1960
 661st Radar Squadron
 Selfridge Air Force Base, Michigan, 1 April 1966 – 14 November 1969
 662d Radar Squadron
 Brookfield Air Force Station, Ohio, 1 April 1966 – 30 September 1969
 664th Radar Squadron
 Bellefontaine Air Force Station, Ohio, 1 April 1966 – 30 September 1969
 674th Aircraft Control and Warning Squadron
 Osceola Air Force Station, Wisconsin, 15 September-14 November 1969
 676th Aircraft Control and Warning Squadron
 Antigo Air Force Station, Wisconsin, 1 July 1968 – 14 November 1969
 684th Aircraft Control and Radar Squadron
 Mount Lemmon Air Force Station, Arizona, 1 April 1956 – 1 January 1960
 685th Aircraft Control and Warning Squadron
 Las Cruces Air Force Station, New Mexico, 1 January 1954 – 1 January 1960
 686th Aircraft Control and Warning Squadron
 Walker Air Force Base, New Mexico, 1 October 1953 – 1 January 1960
 687th Aircraft Control and Warning Squadron
 West Mesa Air Force Station, New Mexico, 1 April 1954 – 1 January 1960
 697th Aircraft Control and Warning Squadron
 Pyote Air Force Station, Texas, 8 December 1956 – 1 January 1960
 739th Radar Squadron
 Wadena Air Force Station, Minnesota, 15 September-14 November 1969

 752d Radar Squadron
 Empire Air Force Station, Michigan, 1 April-14 November 1966
 753d Radar Squadron
 Sault Sainte Marie Air Force Station, Michigan, 15 September-14 November 1969
 754th Radar Squadron
 Port Austin Air Force Station, Michigan, 1 April 1966 – 14 November 1969
 755th Radar Squadron
 Arlington Heights Air Force Station, Illinois, 1 July 1968 – 30 September 1969
 756th Radar Squadron
 Finland Air Force Station, Minnesota, 15 September-19 November 1969
 763d Radar Squadron
 Lockport Air Force Station, New York, 1 April 1966 – 15 September 1969
 767th Aircraft Control and Warning Squadron
 Tierra Amarilla Air Force Station, New Mexico, 1 May 1951 – 8 February 1959
 768th Aircraft Control and Warning Squadron
 Moriarty Air Force Station, New Mexico, 1 May 1951 – 1 January 1960
 769th Aircraft Control and Warning Squadron
 Continental Divide Air Force Station, New Mexico, 1 May 1951 – 1 January 1960
 783d Radar Squadron
 Guthrie Air Force Station, West Virginia, 1 April 1966 – 18 June 1968
 784th Radar Squadron
 Snow Mountain Air Force Station, Kentucky, 1 April 1966 – 18 June 1968
 904th Aircraft Warning and Control Squadron
 Winslow Air Force Station, Arizona, 1 April 1955 – 1 January 1960

See also
 List of United States Air Force Aerospace Defense Command Interceptor Squadrons
 List of United States Air Force air divisions
 United States general surveillance radar stations

References

Notes

Bibliography

 
 
 

Aerospace Defense Command units
034
1951 establishments in New Mexico
1969 disestablishments in Michigan